Mohamed Abu Samra is the current secretary-general of the Islamic Party, which is the political arm of Egyptian Islamic Jihad. Abu Samra stated in an interview that the Muslim Brotherhood was not successful in applying Sharia and that he supported the changing of the government. However, in an interview with Cairo Al-Akhbar, he called for a revolt if President Mohamed Morsi was deposed. As of September 2013 he was calling for peaceful protests and disavowed the actions of jihadist groups in the Sinai. He called on Egyptian judges to adhere to the law by stopping their strike that occurred in 2012. Abu Sanra said that he would be opposed towards returning Israeli Jews of Egyptian descent to Egypt in response to a comment made by Essam el-Erian, a member of the Freedom and Justice Party and an adviser to then president Mohamed Morsi; he also stated that according to Sharia law, Jews deserve to be fought and killed by Muslims.

References 

Living people
Egyptian Muslims
Egyptian Islamists
Egyptian Islamic Jihad
Islam and antisemitism
Year of birth missing (living people)